Protein O-linked-mannose beta-1,2-N-acetylglucosaminyltransferase 1 is an enzyme that in humans is encoded by the POMGNT1 gene.


Function and expression 

The product of the POMGNT1 gene, protein O-mannose beta-1,2-N-acetylglucosaminyltransferase (POMGnT1), participates in O-mannosyl glycan synthesis. A mutation in this gene is the cause of muscle-eye-brain disease (MIM 253280).

Transcription of the POMGNT1 gene gives rise to a 2.7 kb mRNA in different tissues, with higher expression levels in the skeletal muscle, heart, and kidney and lower levels in the brain. POMGnT1 (EC 2.4.1.101) is a protein belonging to the GT13 family of glycosyltransferases according to the Carbohydrate-Active enZYmes (CAZy) database. In humans, the main isoform of POMGnT1 contains 660 amino acids whose sequence yields a calculated molecular mass of 75,252 Da (UniProtKB Q8WZA1).

The POMGNT1 mRNA and its encoded protein is expressed in the neural retina of all mammals studied. POMGnT1 locates in the cytoplasmic fraction in the mouse retina, where it concentrates in the Golgi complex within the myoid of photoreceptor inner segments.

References

Further reading

External links 
  GeneReviews/NCBI/NIH/UW entry on Congenital Muscular Dystrophy Overview